Alexandrina Hristov (born 5 May 1978 in Chișinău, Republic of Moldova, is a Romanian singer, who became popular with her song "Fata merge pe jos" ("The girl walks") from the album "Om de lut" ("The Clay Man") released in 2009. She is also a painter and an actress.

Life and career

Alexandrina Hristov grew up in a family of artists. Her father is the painter Victor Hristov and her mother was an actress and a singer. Hristov started playing the piano and composing her own songs at the age of 8.

She graduated from the Academy of Music, Theatre and Fine Arts in Chișinău and has incorporated painting and poetry in her music since then. In 2005 she played a main part in Paul Cuzuioc's movie "Trois femmes de Moldavie", whose soundtrack also included some of her songs. That same year she moved together with her family to Romania where she played a series of concerts at Cafe Deko in Bucharest.

In 2009, Hristov released her first album, "Omul de lut"("The Clay Man") which included songs such as "Printre flori"("Among flowers"), "Roule le taxi" and "Maria (de leagăn)"("Maria (lullaby)"). 
Hristov was appreciated for her special voice and artistic approach. Over the past years Hristov has performed at Untold Festival, Gărâna Jazz Festival, Peștera Bolii Festival and Transilvania International Film Festival. 
She also appeared at several Romanian TV shows on Pro TV, TVR1 and Antena1 channels. She gained most of her fans through her performances, as well as on the internet and peer-to-peer networks.

In 2016, Hristov has toured Romania, with her "10 Year Anniversary" tour, a series of sold-out concerts performed in the cities of Iasi, Timișoara, Cluj and Bucharest. The integrated three-wall light-show and the sound of the theremin created a totally new experience and set a whole new standard for future concerts.

Musical style and influences

Hristov sings in Romanian, French and Russian. Her unique style is influenced by an array of genres, including acoustic, rock, jazz and soul. Hristov counts PJ Harvey, Björk and Morcheeba as her main influences. The greatest one is Tori Amos, with whom she shares the joy of piano playing and the quirkiness of the lyrics.

Albums
The first album "Om de lut" ("The Clay Man"), released on April 9, 2009, included a collection of old and new songs. Hristov's described it as: "'The Clay Man' is my child, a beautiful child, healthy, gentle[...].His heart beats on jazz, soul, funk and electropop rhythms. The Clay Man will sing about wonder, flight, quest, ships and seas, planes, green eyes, nostalgia and insomnia, flowers and nerves, Zorro and Prince Charming... love and the cosmos, women, rain, wind, about the King and the Queen."

The second album, "Flori de Spin" ("Flowers of Thorns") was released on 5 April 2014 and contains the hit singles "Orasul Umbre" ("Shadow City"), "Pijamale Reci"("Cold Pijamas"), "Te iubesc" ("I Love You") and the theme song, "Flori de Spin" ("Flowers of Thorns"). "Orasul Umbre" was featured as theme of the "Umbre" HBO Romania series.

In 2016, Alexandrina released two new  songs, called "Dupa Pod" and "Viberi Menya" (in Russian)

References

External links 
  Official Website
 Interview in La Blogotheque
  Trois femme de Moldavie

Romanian people of Moldovan descent
Musicians from Chișinău
21st-century Romanian women singers
21st-century Romanian singers
Moldovan expatriates in Romania
1978 births
Living people